The 2007 Bowling Green Falcons football team represented Bowling Green State University in the 2007 NCAA Division I FBS football season. The team was coached by Gregg Brandon and played their home games in Doyt Perry Stadium in Bowling Green, Ohio. It was the 89th season of play for the Falcons.  Bowling Green finished the season 8–5 overall and has finished 4–2 in the MAC East. They participated in the GMAC Bowl, losing to Tulsa 63–7.  They capped the regular season by beating arch rival Toledo for the first time in 3 years.

Pre-season
Bowling Green was picked to finish fifth in the MAC East Division by the MAC News Media Association.  Three Falcons, Senior Kory Lichtensteiger and Juniors Erique Dozier and Corey Partridge, garnered preseason honors by being named to All-MAC preseason teams.

All-MAC preseason teams
 First team
 Kory Lichtensteiger, C
 Second team
 Erique Dozier, LB
 Corey Partridge, WR

Schedule

Roster
The 2007 Bowling Green Falcons football team consists of 96 total players. The class breakdown of these players is 12 seniors, 21 juniors, 30 sophomores, 12 redshirt freshman, and 19 true freshman. Returning starters from the 2006 team are six offensive starters and eight defensive starters. Overall, 53 lettermen are returning from the 2006 team (25 on offense, 28 on defense and 0 on special teams).

Coaching staff
 Gregg Brandon – Head Coach
 Troy Rothenbuhler – Asst. Head Coach/Tight Ends/Recruiting
 Mick McCall – Offensive Coordinator
 Mike Ward – Defensive Coordinator
 Stephen Bird – Special Teams/Outside Receivers
 Matt Campbell – Offensive Line
 Adam Gonzaga – Secondary
 Deion Melvin – Linebackers
 John Hunter – Running Backs
 Doug Phillips – Defensive Line
 Jason Morton – Offensive Assistant
 Brad Wilson – Defensive Assistant
 Aaron Hillmann – Strength and Conditioning
 David Ebersbach – Director of Operations

Student assistants

 Mike Burtch
 Nick Byer
 Ryan Riebau
 Kevin Zilch
 Brendon Skowronski
 Greg Brabenec

Post season
As the 2007 college football season neared the end, many organizations began to announce finalists and winners of various post-season awards. Kory Lichtensteiger was named a finalist for the Rimington Trophy, given to the nation's best center. He was one of 6 athletes recognized.  Bowling Green also had eight players make the All-Conference Teams (the fourth most of any school in the MAC).

Statistics

Team

Scores by quarter

Offense

Rushing

Passing

Receiving

Statistics from:

References

Bowling Green
Bowling Green Falcons football seasons
Bowling Green Falcons football